Ênio Santos de Oliveira or simply Ênio (born 11 March 1985) is a Brazilian central defender.

A native of Araguaína in the central Brazilian state of Goiás (formed into Tocantins in 1988), he has been playing for Cabofriense since 5 December 2007, while on loan from Cruzeiro.

Contract
Cabofriense (Loan) 5 December 2007 to 31 December 2008
Cruzeiro 2 January 2007 to 30 April 2009

External links
 Statistics for Ênio on CBF Registry of Footballers

Brazilian footballers
Cruzeiro Esporte Clube players
Associação Desportiva Cabofriense players
Joinville Esporte Clube players
Sportspeople from Goiás
1985 births
Living people
Association football defenders